The New Year Honours 1912 were appointments by King George V to various orders and honours to reward and highlight good works by members of the British Empire. They were announced on 29 December 1911.

Order of the Bath

Knight Grand Cross (GCB)
Military Division
General Count Maresuke Nogi, Imperial Japanese Army. (Honorary)

Knight Commander (KCB)
Civil Division
Sir Charles Prestwood Lucas, K.C.M.G., C.B.

Companion (CB)
Civil Division
Major John Grey Baldwin.
Edmund Kerchever Chambers, Esq.
Henry Ernest Fitzwilliam Comyn, Esq.
Sir Melville Leslie Macnaghten.
William Francis Marwood, Esq.
Charles Henry Lawrence Neish, Esq.
Arthur Newsholme, Esq., M.D.
Andrew Muter John Ogilvie, Esq.
James Duncan Stuart Sim, Esq.
Alfred Walter Soward, Esq.
William Gibbs Turpin, Esq.
Archibald Edwards Widdows, Esq.

Order of Saint Michael and Saint George

Knight Grand Cross (GCMG)
Sir George Ruthven Le Hunte, K.C.M.G., Governor and Commander-in-Chief of the Colony of Trinidad and Tobago.

Knight Commander (KCMG)
Sir Edward Albert Stone, Knight, Lieutenant-Governor of the State of Western Australia.
His Honour Colonel John Morison Gibson, K.C., LL.D., Lieutenant-Governor of the Province of Ontario.
Joseph Pope, Esq., C.V.O., C.M.G., I.S.O., Under Secretary of State for External Affairs, Dominion of Canada.
George Vandeleur Fiddes, Esq., C.B., C.M.G., Assistant Under Secretary of State, Colonial Office.
George Townsend Fenwick, Esq., C.M.G., Unofficial Member of the Legislative Council of the Colony of Trinidad and Tobago.
The Honourable Thomas Watt, C.M.G., Member of the House of Assembly of the Union of South Africa.
His Highness Suleiman bin Almerhum Raja Musa, C.M.G., Sultan of Selangor. (Honorary)
Rear-Admiral the Honourable Alexander Edward Bethell, C.M.G., Director of Naval Intelligence.

Companion (CMG)
Thomas Cooper Boville, Esq., Deputy Minister of Finance of the Dominion of Canada.
John Frank Brown, Esq., Member of the Provincial Council and of the Executive Committee of the Transvaal Province, Union of South Africa.
Horace Archer Byatt, Esq., Commissioner and Commander-in-Chief for the Somaliland Protectorate.
Douglas Graham Campbell, Esq., General Adviser to the Government of Johore.
Harry John Charles Diddams, Esq., Mayor of the City of Brisbane.
William Francis Joseph Fitzpatrick, Esq., Chairman of Railway Commissioners for Victoria.
The Honourable Alexander Hean, Minister of Lands and Works of the State of Tasmania, and recently Acting Premier, of that State.
Edbert Ansgar Hewett, Esq., Unofficial Member of the Executive and Legislative Councils of the Colony of Hong Kong.
Major Richard Abercrombie Irvine, Provincial Commissioner, Northern Territories of the Gold Coast.
 Thomas Orr, Esq., Member of the House of Assembly of the Union of South Africa.
Lieutenant-Colonel David Prain, C.I.E., F.R.S., Director of the Royal Botanic Gardens, Kew.
Daniel Woodley Prowse, Esq., K.C., LL.D., Author of "A History of Newfoundland".
Colonel Alfred William Robin, C.B., Adjutant-General to the New Zealand Military Forces.
Tan Jiak Kim, Esq., Unofficial Member of the Legislative Council of the Straits Settlements.
Maurice Edward Wingfield, Esq., recently Acting Colonial Secretary of the Colony of the Gambia.
Salim bin Khalfan, Liwali of Mombasa. (Honorary)
Milne Cheetham, Esq., Councillor of Embassy in His Majesty's Diplomatic Service attached to His Majesty's Agency and Consulate-General at Cairo.
James Frederick Roberts, Esq., His Majesty's Consul-General at Barcelona.
Donald Andreas Cameron, Esq., His Majesty's Consul-General at Alexandria.
Henry Fountain, Esq., Principal Clerk in the Board of Trade.
James McIver MacLeod, Esq., His Majesty's Consul at Fez.

Royal Victorian Order

Knight Commander (KCVO)
The Hon. Sidney Robert Greville, C.V.O., C.B.
The Hon. Arthur Henry John Walsh, C.V.O.

Member, 4th Class
Bertram Mackennal, Esq., A.R.A.

References

New Year Honours
1912 in the United Kingdom
1912 awards